Bavua Ntinu André (born March 22, 1939, and Death on October 5, 2013) was a martial art practitioner and initiator of Japanese sports (Karate and Judo) in the Democratic Republic of the Congo known as the Great Master Bavua Ntinu Decantor, founder of the National School of Martial Arts (EMAM) and, Supreme Chief of Spiritual Power of the Verb (PSV), which he was also founder and first spiritual leader of the organization.

References

External links 

 Les apollons de Kinshasa (13 Janvier 2018)

1939 births
2013 deaths
Religious leaders
Democratic Republic of the Congo sportspeople
Democratic Republic of the Congo people
Deaths in the Democratic Republic of the Congo